Lectionary 88, designated by siglum ℓ 88 (in the Gregory-Aland numbering), is a Greek manuscript of the New Testament, on paper leaves. Palaeographically it has been assigned to the 14th-century.

Description 

The codex contains lessons from the Gospels of John, Matthew, Luke lectionary (Evangelistarium) with numerous lacunae. It is written in Greek minuscule letters, on 190 paper leaves. The writing stands in 2 columns per page, 22-26 lines per page.

Two pages of the manuscript belong to the codex 0115.

History 

The manuscript once belonged to Colbert's (as were ℓ 87, ℓ 89, ℓ 90, ℓ 91, ℓ 99, ℓ 100, ℓ 101). 

Scholz examined some passages of it. It was examined and described by Paulin Martin. C. R. Gregory saw it in 1883. 

The manuscript is not cited in the critical editions of the Greek New Testament (UBS3).

Currently the codex is located in the Bibliothèque nationale de France (Gr. 314) in Paris.

See also 

 List of New Testament lectionaries
 Biblical manuscript
 Textual criticism

References 

Greek New Testament lectionaries
14th-century biblical manuscripts
Bibliothèque nationale de France collections